Ramal do Porto de Aveiro is a railway branch in Portugal which connects the cargo terminal of Cacia to the Port of Aveiro. It was opened in March 2010.

See also 
 List of railway lines in Portugal
 History of rail transport in Portugal

References

Sources
 

Railway lines in Portugal
Iberian gauge railways
Railway lines opened in 2010